The Tunisia women's national under-20 basketball team, nicknamed Les Aigles de Carthage (The Eagles of Carthage or The Carthage Eagles), is a national basketball team of Tunisia, administered by the Tunisia Basketball Federation (FTBB). 
It represents the country in international under-21 and under-20 (under age 20 and under age 19) women's basketball competitions.

Competitive record
 Champions   Runners-up   Third place   Fourth place

Red border color indicates tournament was held on home soil.

FIBA Under-21 World Championship

FIBA Africa Under-20 Championship for Women

See also
Tunisia women's national basketball team
Tunisia women's national under-19 basketball team
Tunisia women's national under-17 basketball team
Tunisia men's national under-20 basketball team

External links
 Archived records of Tunisia team participations

References

Women's national under-20 basketball teams
Basketball in Tunisia
Women
Basketball